Mishijan-e Olya (also Romanized as Mīshījān-e ‘Olyā and Mīshījan ‘Olya, ; also known as Meyshī Jān, Mīshajān Bālā, Mīshjān-e Bālā, Mīshjān-e ‘Olyā, Mōshīān, and Mūshījān) is a village in Salehan Rural District, in the Central District of Khomeyn County, Markazi Province, Iran. At the 2006 census, its population was 952, in 263 families.

References 

Populated places in Khomeyn County